Trevor Robert Cornford (born 1949) is a British businessman, award-winning philatelist, and chairman of the Polar Postal History Society of Great Britain. He is a fellow of the Royal Geographical Society.

Early life
Trevor Cornford was born in April 1949.

Career
Cornford had a career in financial services and was a director of Tiercey Financial Management Limited.

Philately
Cornford is a specialist in polar philately and the chairman of the Polar Postal History Society of Great Britain. He has displayed before the members of the Royal Philatelic Society London on the philately of Captain Scott's last expedition. In November 2008, items from Cornford's polar exploration collection were sold at Grosvenor Philatelic Auctions in London. In 2011, Cornford won a Large Vermeil medal in Sheffield for his display of the philately of Ernest Shackleton's Antarctic voyages 1901-1922.

In January 1997, Cornford was elected a fellow of the Royal Geographical Society.

References

External links
 Polar Postal History Society of Great Britain

1949 births
Fellows of the Royal Geographical Society
British businesspeople
British philatelists
Living people